Jazbaat may refer to:

Jazbaat (1980 film), directed and written by Suraj Prakash
Jazbaat (1994 film), directed by Anant Balani